The New Internet Computer (NIC) was a Linux-based internet appliance released July 6, 2000 by Larry Ellison's and Gina Smith's New Internet Computer Company. The system (without a monitor) sold for US$199.

The NIC boots from a CD-ROM with a custom Linux distribution developed by Wim Coekaerts.  It has no hard drive and no way to install additional software.  The system's only nonvolatile storage is 4 MB of flash memory.

Ellison planned to sell 5 million units the first year, but fewer than 50,000 units were sold. The company shut its doors in June 2003.  PC World ranked the NIC as the ninth worst PC of all time.

References

External links
Internet Appliance Eliminates Hard Drive J.D. Biersdorfer, New York Times, September 28, 2000
Wim Coekaerts is Oracle's Mr. Linux Steve Lipson, Oracle Magazine
Linux and the New Internet Computer Billy Hall, Linux Journal, February 2001

Personal computers